Edward ("Eddie") McGuire (born 1948) is a Scottish composer whose work ranges from compositions for solo instruments and voice to large-scale orchestral and operatic works. McGuire studied composition with James Iliff at the Royal Academy of Music in London from 1966 to 1970 and then with Ingvar Lidholm in Stockholm in 1971.

Early life
McGuire was born and brought up in Possilpark in Glasgow. His father played folk violin and was a member of a male voice choir which sang arrangements of Scottish Gaelic and Irish songs at charity concerts.

Career
As a student at the Royal Academy of Music McGuire won the Hecht Prize (1968) and the National Young Composers Competition (held in Liverpool University in 1969). A competition organised by the Society for the Promotion of New Music to find a modern test piece for the 1978 Carl Flesch International Violin Competition was won by McGuire with a solo violin piece, Rant. This piece was recently performed for a 65th birthday concert for McGuire organised by the BBC Scottish Symphony Club which was followed by another concert at the Edinburgh Festival Fringe. Another early success was when String Quartet was selected for the 40th anniversary Barbican Gala of the SPNM in 1983. His 3 act opera The Loving of Etain to a libretto by Marianne Carey was premiered by Paragon Opera at the Atheneum Theatre, Glasgow, in 1990. McGuire's 2 act opera Cullercoats Tommy, with a libretto by Michael Wilcox was premiered by Northern Sinfonia and Northern Stage in Newcastle upon Tyne in 1993. McGuire received a British Composers' Award in 2003. In 2004 he received a Creative Scotland Award which allowed him to create the work Defying Fate. He was commissioned to produce the finale for the 2006 St Magnus Festival, Ring of Strings. Calgacus, first recorded in 1997 by BBCSSO at the London Proms was performed again by the same orchestra for 2014 Celtic Connections. His most frequently performed work has been his 3 act ballet Peter Pan staged by Scottish Ballet and Hong Kong Ballet over 120 times with a page dedicated to it on his website.

McGuire plays the flute in the folk group the Whistlebinkies. In January 2006 he travelled to Hong Kong with the group to play a concert ("Scotland the Brave") with the City Chamber Orchestra of Hong Kong.

A CD of his music, Eddie McGuire: Music for Flute, Guitar and Piano, on the Delphian Records label was 'Editor's Choice' in Gramophone magazine in 2006. In 2015 Delphian Records released Entangled Fortunes performed by the Red Note Ensemble and once again featured in Gramophone magazine 'Editor's Choice'

Selected compositions
 McGuire, Edward. Calgacus: Symphonic Poem. Glasgow: Scottish Music Centre, 1997. Musical score.
 McGuire, Edward. Celtic Knotwork: for 3 recorders, voices, 4 flutes or 4 clarinets. Glasgow: Scottish Music Centre, 1990. Musical score.
 McGuire, Edward. Violin Sonatina: for violin and piano. Glasgow: Scottish Music Centre, 1997. Musical score.
 McGuire, Edward. Romance for Cello, Guitar, 1994. Glasgow: Scottish Music Centre, 1998. Musical score.
 McGuire, Edward. Concerto for Trombone: for trombone and string orchestra. Glasgow: Scottish Music Centre, 1997. Musical score.
 McGuire, Edward. Concerto for Viola: for viola and string orchestra. Glasgow: Scottish Music Centre, 1998. Musical score.
 McGuire, Edward. Concerto for Cello: for cello and string orchestra, Glasgow: Scottish Music Centre, 2020. Musical score.
 McGuire, Edward. Trio for Flute, Oboe, Bassoon. Glasgow: Scottish Music Centre, 1971. Musical score.
 McGuire, Edward. Prelude 22: (the Big Bang) : Solo Trumpet. Coventry: Warwick Music, 2005. Musical score.
 McGuire, Edward. Symphony: for symphony orchestra. Glasgow: Scottish Music Centre, 1978. Musical score.
 McGuire, Edward. Source: a Symphonic Poem: for symphony orchestra. Glasgow: Scottish Music Centre, 1979. Musical score.
 McGuire, Edward. Rant: for solo violin. Glasgow: Scottish Music Centre, 1986. Musical score.
 McGuire, Edward. Peter Pan: a ballet score in 3 acts: for symphony orchestra. Glasgow: Scottish Music Centre, 1990. Musical score.
 McGuire, Edward. String Trio II: McEwen Commission. Glasgow: Scottish Music Centre, 2019. Musical score.
 McGuire, Edward. String Quartet: SPNM competition winner. Glasgow: Scottish Music Centre, 1982. Musical score.
 McGuire, Edward. Kaleidoscope Suite: for double wind quintet. Glasgow: Scottish Music Centre, 2019. Musical score.
 McGuire, Edward. On Inchcolm: for SATB choir & ensemble to poem by Tom Furniss. Glasgow: Scottish Music Centre, 2017. Musical score.
 McGuire, Edward. Three Comic Sketches: suite for 4 bass clarinets. Glasgow: Scottish Music Centre, 2020. Musical score.
 McGuire, Edward. Euphoria: for sextet. Recorded by Red Note on Delphian. Glasgow: Scottish Music Centre, 2020. Musical score.

Selected recordings
 McGuire, Eddie. Luminate: Live Music Now Scotland Celebrates 30 Years. Edinburgh: Delphian Records, 2015. Sound recording.
 McGuire, Eddie. Albannach performed by The Whistlebinkies: 2006. https://www.greentrax.com/music/product/The-Whistlebinkies-Albannach-CD
 McGuire, Edward. Dancing Memories, Mrs. De Ruyg's Delight. S.l: s.n., 2006. Sound recording.
 McGuire, Edward. Fast Peace 3. Point of Departure. the Alma Duo (Phyllis Kamrin, viola, and Michael Goldberg, guitar) perform McGuire's Fast Peace 3 (KA9001CD) Kamelion 1994
 McGuire, Edward. Viola Pieces. James Durrant performs McGuire's Divertimento for 20 Violas, Prelude 6 and Martyr (ALTO CD1) Alto Records 1994
 McGuire, Edward. Upstart Jugglers: Mr McFall's Chamber ensemble perform McGuire's Nocturnes (MMCC 003) Mr McFalls Chamber 2001
 McGuire, Eddie. Music for Flute, Guitar and Piano (DCD34029) Delphian Records 2006: Nancy Ruffer (flute), Abigail James (guitar) and Dominic Saunders (piano) 
 McGuire, Eddie. Flotilla: the Flotilla trio of 2 soprano saxophones and alto saxophone perform McGuire's Remembrance (ATKS 0802) Big Shed Music 2008
 McGuire, Eddie. Knotwork: the Fell Clarinet Quartet perform McGuire's Celtic Knotwork and Chinese Knotwork (DCD34065) Delphian Records 2008
 McGuire, Edward. Embracing the Unknown: Edinburgh String Quartet, John Kenny (trombone), Catriona McKay (harp) play McGuire's Guest Sextet (BC3010) Brass Classics 2009
 McGuire, Edward. The Prairie Song Project: Amy Morris (flute) and Michael Heaston (piano) perform McGuire's Aria Prairie Song Project 2012
 McGuire, Edward. Guitar Phases: Stefan Grasse performs McGuire's Dark Cloud for 8 guitars (Xolo CD 1033) Xolo
 McGuire, Edward. Celtic Prayer: Paisley Abbey Choir sings McGuire's Three Donne Lyrics

References

Further reading
 Ross, Raymond J. (1983), An Interview with Eddie McGuire, in Hearn, Sheila G. (ed.), Cencrastus No. 14, Autumn 1983, pp. 23 – 27,

External links 
 
 
 
 
 
 
 

1948 births
20th-century classical composers
21st-century classical composers
Alumni of the Royal Academy of Music
Living people
Scottish classical composers
British male classical composers
20th-century Scottish musicians
20th-century British composers
20th-century British male musicians
21st-century British male musicians